Rakta Bandham (English: Blood Relation) is a Telugu film starring Chiranjeevi and Nutan Prasad.

Cast 
 Chiranjeevi as  Sub inspector of Police Tilak
 Prasad Babu as Ranjan Babu
 Nutan Prasad as Bhagotham
 Suvarna as Sunitha
 Kavita as Chendri
 Sumithra as Bharathi
 Roja Ramani as Malli
 J. V. Ramana Murthi as Dharma Rao
 Pushpalatha as Saradamma
 Thyagaraju
 Jayamalini
 Valluri Venkatramaiah
 Jayasheela

Crew 
 Dialogues: Modukuri Johnson
 Lyrics: Dr. C. Narayana Reddy & Jaladi
 Playback Singers: P. Susheela, S. Janaki, S.P. Balasubrahmanyam, G. Anand, S.P. Sailaja, Rajesh, Latha Rani & Vinod
 Dances: Seshu
 Art: Ranga Rao
 Stunts: Selvamani
 Editing: Nayani Maheshwara Rao
 Cinematography: P. Bhaskar Rao
 Music: G.K. Venkatesh
 Producers: S. Vijaya Lakshmi & P.S. Krishna
 Story, Screenplay & Direction: Aluri Ravi

References

External links 
 

1980s Telugu-language films
1980 films
Films scored by G. K. Venkatesh